Jupiter Award may refer to:

 Jupiter Award (science fiction award)
 Jupiter Award (film award)